Zosteriform metastasis is the spread of visceral carcinomas to the skin in dermatomal crops of succulent nodules.

See also 
 Alopecia neoplastica
 List of cutaneous conditions

References 

Dermal and subcutaneous growths